Dissocarpus is a genus of flowering plants belonging to the family Amaranthaceae.

Its native range is Australia.

Species:

Dissocarpus biflorus 
Dissocarpus fontinalis 
Dissocarpus latifolius 
Dissocarpus paradoxus

References

Amaranthaceae
Amaranthaceae genera